Daniel, Dan or Danny Stevens may refer to:

 Daniel Bartlett Stevens (1837–1924), Wisconsin politician
 Daniel D. Stevens (1839–1916), US Navy sailor during the American Civil War
 Dan Stevens (born 1982), British actor
 Dan Stevens (musician) (born 1978), American punk rock musician
 E. Dan Stevens (born 1943), member of the Michigan House of Representatives
 Dan Stevens (Minnesota politician) (born 1950), member of the Minnesota State Senate
 Danny Stevens (Australian footballer) (born 1976), Australian rules footballer
 Danny Stevens (footballer, born 1986), English footballer 
 Daniel Stevens (politician) (1746–1835), intendant (mayor) of Charleston, South Carolina